Paralebedella is a genus of moths in the family Cossidae.

Species
 Paralebedella carnescens Hampson, 1910
 Paralebedella estherae Lehmann, 2008
 Paralebedella schultzei (Aurivillius, 1905)
 Paralebedella shimonii Lehmann, 2009

References

External links
Natural History Museum Lepidoptera generic names catalog

Metarbelinae